Lise Abrams is an American cognitive psychologist. She is the Peter W. Stanley Professor of Linguistics and Cognitive Science at Pomona College and also serves as the chair of Linguistics and Cognitive Science.

Education 
Abrams graduated from Pomona College in 1991, earning her B.A. (cum laude) with a double major in psychology and mathematics. She then attended the University of California, Los Angeles, earning an M.A. and Ph.D. in cognitive psychology, in 1992 and 1997 respectively.

Career 
Following her graduation, Abrams joined the faculty in the Department of Psychology at the University of Florida, where she was remained until 2018, at which time she accepted an appointment as professor at Pomona College.

Abrams conducts research on language and memory processes in younger and older adults, including tip of the tongue states, speech production and comprehension, and bilingualism. She is a fellow of the Association for Psychological Science, the American Psychological Association, and the Gerontological Society of America. She earned the Sigma Xi Young Investigator Award in 2007.

References

External links

Lise Abrams Curriculum Vitae. Pomona College.

Year of birth missing (living people)
Living people
American women psychologists
Linguists from the United States
Pomona College alumni
University of California, Los Angeles alumni
University of Florida faculty
Pomona College faculty
Fellows of the American Psychological Association
Fellows of the Association for Psychological Science
Place of birth missing (living people)
American cognitive psychologists
Women linguists
20th-century American psychologists
20th-century linguists
21st-century American psychologists
21st-century linguists
American women academics
21st-century American women